Abadchi may refer to:
 Abadchi-ye Olya
 Abadchi-ye Sofla